Bucks Township is one of the twenty-two townships of Tuscarawas County, Ohio, United States.  The 2000 census found 1,601 people in the township, 972 of whom lived in the unincorporated portions of the township.

Geography
Located in the western part of the county, it borders the following townships:
Auburn Township - northeast
Jefferson Township - east
Salem Township - southeast corner
Adams Township, Coshocton County - south
White Eyes Township, Coshocton County - southwest corner
Crawford Township, Coshocton County - west
Clark Township, Holmes County - northwest

Part of the village of Baltic is located in the northwestern corner of Bucks Township.

Name and history
It is the only Bucks Township statewide.

Government
The township is governed by a three-member board of trustees, who are elected in November of odd-numbered years to a four-year term beginning on the following January 1. Two are elected in the year after the presidential election and one is elected in the year before it. There is also an elected township fiscal officer, who serves a four-year term beginning on April 1 of the year after the election, which is held in November of the year before the presidential election. Vacancies in the fiscal officership or on the board of trustees are filled by the remaining trustees.  The current trustees are Terry Mizer, Douglas Ott, and Gene Stein, and the fiscal officer is Amy Mizer.

References

External links
County website

Townships in Tuscarawas County, Ohio
Townships in Ohio